Savannah Law Review was a scholarly law review journal focusing on current legal issues.

Description
Savannah Law Review was inclusive and ambitious in its scholarship. The journal contributed to a robust plural dialogue by publishing well-researched, provocative works that draw the legal tradition forward, answer vexing questions, and propose novel theories. Members dedicated their valuable time and talents in the service of an organization that is both timely and relevant.

Savannah Law Review conformed  all citations to The Bluebook: A Uniform System of Citation. For grammatical and style issues not addressed by The Bluebook, the Chicago Manual of Style controls.

Savannah Law Review’s publication was set in Equity font, a typeface by Matthew Butterick. The journal was printed by Western Publishing, 537 East Ohio Street, Indianapolis, IN 46204.

Cite to Savannah Law Review as Savannah L. Rev.

History
The Savannah Law Review began in 2013 and was a student-run law review publication at Savannah Law School. 2016 marks the law review's third volume.

Membership selection
Using a competitive process that takes into account grades and performance on a writing exercise, the Savannah Law Review offered membership to student legal scholars at Savannah Law School.

Colloquia
Each year, the Savannah Law Review held a colloquium at Savannah Law School which focused on pressing legal issues. The colloquium consisted of a keynote address by a leader in the field, and panels discussing new aspects of symposium's topic. These included:
 2016 – American Legal Fictions
 2015 – The Walking Dead
 2014 – [Re]Integrating Spaces

References

American law journals
General law journals
Law journals edited by students
Annual journals
English-language journals
Publications established in 2012
2012 establishments in Georgia (U.S. state)